Guas is a surname. Notable people with the name include:

 David Guas (born 1975), American chef and TV personality
 Juan Guas (c. 1430–33 – c. 1496), Spanish artist and architect of French origin
 Rafael Guas Inclán (1896–1975), Cuban politician and vice president of Cuba

See also
 Gūās, an alternate name for Guvas, a village in Iran